Gorden-Staupitz is a municipality in the Elbe-Elster district, in Brandenburg, Germany.

History
From 1952 to 1990, the constituent localities of Gorden-Staupitz were part of the Bezirk Cottbus of East Germany. On 31 December 2001, the municipality of Gorden-Staupitz was formed by merging the municipalities of Gorden and Staupitz.

Demography

References

Localities in Elbe-Elster